The Graham-Paige 835 introduced at the New York Automobile Show in January 1928 was the largest of that year's Graham-Paige range. It was powered by a 120 bhp, 5279 cc straight eight-cylinder L-head engine bought in from Continental. The transmission was a Warner Gear four-speed unit with first intended only as a reserve or emergency gear, second for normal starts and third and fourth as a choice as top gear depending on road conditions. The  wheelbase chassis had balloon tires and pressed steel wheels.

The engines were rubber mounted.

Papal limousine
A Graham-Paige 837 limousine was supplied to Pope Pius XI, becoming one of the first papal cars.

References

1920s cars
Road transport of heads of state
Cars of the United States